Youssef Khalil is a Lebanese economist and politician who serves as Minister of Finance in the Najib Mikati cabinet since 2021. Khalil joined the Banque du Liban as an economist in 1982, where his most recent appointment was as Executive director of BDL's Financial Operations department. He is also a part-time lecturer at the American University of Beirut, where his main emphasis has been on Development Economics. Khalil is the co-founder and president of the Association for the Development of Rural Capacities (ADR), an NGO with projects pertaining to low income housing, microfinance, vocational training agricultural development.

He holds a PhD in Economics from the Center for Studies and Research on International Development (CERDI) at the Clermont Auvergne University in France, a Master's degree in Economic Development from the University of Sussex in the UK, and a Bachelor's degree in Economics from the American University of Beirut. He is the author of several published articles on Economic Development in Lebanon and the region, and an invited speaker and participant in numerous national and international conferences and workshops.

Khalil is an active member at a number of non-governmental organizations, including the Euro-Arab Association for Development and Integration (READI) and the president of Teach for Lebanon (TFL), the Lebanese Microfinance Association (LMFA), and the Lebanese Jiu-jitsu Federation.

References

1958 births
Living people
American University of Beirut alumni
Alumni of the University of Sussex
Lebanese bankers
Lebanese economists
Finance ministers of Lebanon
Amal Movement politicians
People from Tyre, Lebanon